Sand is the administrative centre of Nord-Odal municipality in Innlandet county, Norway. The village lies between two lakes: Råsen and the northwestern arm of Storsjøen. Sand Church lies in the village. This village is the eastern terminus of the Norwegian County Road 181.

References

Nord-Odal
Villages in Innlandet